B. V. Ramamurthy (14.10.1933 - 23.04.2004) was an Indian cartoonist from Bangalore. His regular cartoons were published in newspapers such as the Deccan Herald, Prajavani, Mayura and Sudha from Karnataka. The cartoon column titled Mr. Citizen became popular among newspaper readers. The cartoonist tried to bring out the issues of a common man and also issue of ongoing political developments for over 33 years.

Indian Institute of Cartoonists 
He was the first chairperson of the Indian Institute of Cartoonists until his death in 2004.

References

1933 births
2004 deaths
Indian cartoonists
Indian editorial cartoonists
Journalists from Karnataka
Artists from Bangalore